Spencer Wood may refer to:

 Spencer Wood, the name of Quebecs former Government House; see Government House (Quebec)
 Spencer S. Wood (1861–1940), United States Navy rear admiral

See also 

 Spencers Wood, a village in the civil parish of Shinfield, Berkshire, England